Tomas Brunegård (born 1962) is the Chairman of the Swedish Newspaper Publishers' Association and President of World Association of Newspapers and News Publishers (WAN-IFRA). He is also the former CEO of the Swedish media company the Stampen Group. 

Brunegård has Master of Science Business Administration from the School of Business, Economics and Law at the University of Gothenburg, and has previously been vice president of Burger King Sweden (1993–1996).

Member of the Governing Board, International School of Economics, Tbilisi (Georgia) 2010-2014 

Other assignments:
Chairman of TU (Sweden)2008-2013, Board member of Mentor Medier (Norway)2011-, Board member of Utgivarna(Sweden)2012-2013, Board member of Stena Line Holding (Holland)2013-, Board member of FOJO (Sweden)2014-, Board member of Svenska Mässan(Sweden)2004-

References

External links
 stampen.com

1962 births
Living people
Swedish businesspeople
University of Gothenburg alumni